The 1984 UC Davis football team represented the University of California, Davis as a member of the Northern California Athletic Conference (NCAC) during the 1984 NCAA Division II football season. Led by 15th-year head coach Jim Sochor, UC Davis compiled an overall record of 9–2 with a mark of 6–0 in conference play, winning the NCAC title for the 14th consecutive season. 1984 was the team's 15th consecutive winning season. With the 6–0 conference record, the team stretched their conference winning streak to 21 games dating back to the 1981 season. The Aggies were ranked as high as No. 6 in the NCAA Division II poll. They advanced to the NCAA Division II Football Championship playoffs for the third straight year, where they lost to North Dakota State in the quarterfinals. This was the second straight year that North Dakota State eliminated UC Davis in the playoffs. The team outscored its opponents 295 to 133 for the season. The Aggies played home games at Toomey Field in Davis, California.

Schedule

NFL Draft
The following UC Davis Aggies players were selected in the 1985 NFL Draft.

References

UC Davis
UC Davis Aggies football seasons
Northern California Athletic Conference football champion seasons
UC Davis Aggies football